Alberto Setele (born 22 November 1935 in Zavala - 7 September 2006) was a Mozambican clergyman, Roman Catholic Bishop of Inhambane.

Setele was ordained as a priest on 9 August 1964. On 20 November 1975 he was appointed Bishop of Inhambane by Pope Paul VI. The Archbishop of Maputo, Alexandre José Maria dos Santos, consecrated him on 8 February 1976 as bishop, along with Bishop of Beira, Ernesto Gonçalves da Costa, and Januário Machaze Nhangumbe, Bishop of Porto Amélia. He died on 7 September 2006 at the age of 70.

References

21st-century Roman Catholic bishops in Mozambique
1935 births
2006 deaths
People from Inhambane Province
20th-century Roman Catholic bishops in Mozambique
Roman Catholic bishops of Inhambane